Derrick Florence (born June 19, 1968) is a former American sprinter. He had an outstanding career at Ball High School in Galveston, Texas, in the mid-1980s before fading into obscurity. Florence won the gold medal in the 100 metres at the 1986 World Junior Championships and was named "High School Boys Athlete of the Year" by Track & Field News. That same season, he won the Texas high school class 5A state championship in the 200 meters in 20.5, well ahead of future world record holder Michael Johnson (21.3).

References

External links 
 

1968 births
Living people
American male sprinters
Sportspeople from Galveston, Texas
World Athletics U20 Championships winners